The following lists events that happened during 2000 in Sweden.

Incumbents
 Monarch – Carl XVI Gustaf
 Prime Minister – Göran Persson

Events

January
 January 1 - The Church of Sweden is separated from the Swedish State.

Popular culture

Film
 13 May – Faithless, directed by Liv Ullmann, released.
 4 August – Sleepwalker released 
 25 August – Together released in Sweden 
 22 December – Jalla! Jalla!, comedy film directed by Josef Fares

Literature 
 The Return of the Dancing Master, crime novel by Henning Mankell
 Missing, crime fiction novel by Karin Alvtegen

Sports 
 10 December – The 2000 European Cross Country Championships were held in Malmö

Births
 7 April – Julia Kedhammar, singer

Deaths

 8 January – Henry Eriksson, athlete (born 1920).
 13 January – John Ljunggren, athlete (born 1919).
 25 January – Folke Ekström, chess player (born 1906)
 25 February – Doris Löve, botanist (born 1918)
 19 March – Egon Jönsson, footballer (born 1921).
 28 June – Nils Poppe, actor, director and screenwriter (born 1908)
 29 July – Åke Hodell, fighter pilot and poet (born 1919) 
 30 July – Örjan Blomquist, cross-country skier (born 1957)
 28 August – Knut Holmqvist, sport shooter (born 1918).
 18 October – Inga Gill, film actress (born 1925)

References

 
Years of the 20th century in Sweden
Sweden
2000s in Sweden
Sweden